Mariana Elena Adelina Zúñiga Varela (born 12 July 2002) is a Chilean Paralympic archer. She won silver in the Women's individual compound open in the 2020 Summer Paralympics in Tokyo.

Notes

References

External links
 
 

2002 births
Living people
Chilean female archers
Paralympic archers of Chile
Paralympic silver medalists for Chile
Paralympic medalists in archery
Archers at the 2020 Summer Paralympics
Medalists at the 2020 Summer Paralympics
Sportspeople from Santiago
21st-century Chilean women
Competitors at the 2022 World Games